Major General Les Rudman  was a General Officer in the South African Army from the infantry.

Military career 
General Rudman was an honorary Special Forces Operator, Pathfinder and parachutist instructor.
He was appointed to the post of Deputy Chief of the South African Army on 1 October 2011.
He was awarded the Sword of Honour at the South African Military Academy in 1976. He retired at the end of 2014 and was succeeded by Maj Gen Lawrence Smith. He served at 31 Battalion as Company Commander, 32 Battalion with the Pathfinders and for this he was awarded the Pro Virtute Decoration, 1 Parachute Battalion and Brigade Commander  44 Parachute Brigade while still based in Wallmansthall. He was Army attaché to Washington, DC where he was replaced by Col Chris Gildenhuys from the Armoured corps. He was appointed as Commanding General of the Special Forces Brigade reporting to Lt Gen Deon Ferreira and Lt Gen Godfrey Ngwenya, taking over from Brig Gen Borries Bornman. After this prestigious posting, he was promoted to the rank of major general as Chief Director Corporate Services in the Army Headquarters successively under Lt Gen Gilbert Ramano and Lt Gen Solly Shoke. His last appointment was as Deputy Chief of the South African Army.

Honours and awards

Medals

Other 
  (Honorary)

References

External links 
 Photos on Flickr

South African Army generals
South African military officers
Living people
1955 births
Military attachés